Bilateral relations exist between Australia and Japan.

The relationships are generally warm and have since continued to grow strong over the years, both nations being considerably close, substantial and driven by mutual interests, with both nations having close ties with the Western world. Japan is one of Australia's major economic partners: it is Australia's “second largest trading partner and an increasingly important source of capital investment". In recent times the relations have expanded beyond strong economic and commercial links to other spheres, including culture, tourism, defense and scientific cooperation.

Tensions were high in the early stage of the relationship, such as World War II, and Japan's perceived economic domination during the 1980s and early 1990s. However, the Australian government and business leaders see Japan as a vital export market and an essential element in Australia's future growth and prosperity in the Asia-Pacific region.  Japan on its part regards Australia as an important partner, a reliable source of energy, minerals and other primary products, a popular tourist destination, a useful conduit to the West and the only other middle-ranking economic power in the Asia-Pacific. Australia's former Prime-Minister Tony Abbott recently hailed Japan as Australia's closest friend in Asia and proceeded on creating a Free Trade Agreement between the two nations in the coming year. Australia and Japan both acknowledges each other as key strategic partners within the Asia-Pacific. With both being prosperous liberal democracies and key allies of the United States. With former Defence Minister Marise Payne described Japan as a "key partner" in the region, Japanese Prime Minister Fumio Kishida describing the relationship as the linchpin of security in the Indo-Pacific.

Australia maintains an embassy in Tokyo, a consulate-general in Osaka, and a consulate in Sapporo. Japan also maintains an embassy in Canberra, consulates-general in Sydney, Melbourne, Brisbane, and Perth, along with a consulate in Cairns.

History

Colonial and post-federation relations between Australia and the Empire of Japan 
The first recorded import of Australian coal by Japan occurred in 1865, and the first recorded Japanese imports of Australian wool occurred in 1888. The first Japanese person known to have settled in Australia was a merchant who migrated to Queensland in 1871. By the start of the Australian Federation in 1901, it was estimated that Australia had 4000 Japanese immigrants, mostly based around Townsville where the Japanese government had established its first consulate in 1896. The immigrants worked mostly in the sugar cane and maritime industries including turtle, trochus, trepang and pearl harvesting. Further Japanese migration to Australia was effectively terminated with the Australian Immigration Restriction Act of 1901, with the imposition of a "dictation test" in a European language on prospective immigrants, and with the White Australia policy. Due to this the Townsville consulate closed in 1908.

In 1930–31, Japan was "Australia's third most important trading partner". However, economic relations continued to flourish, and by the mid-1930s, Japan had become Australia's second largest export market after the United Kingdom. However, in 1936, Britain applied political pressure on Australia to curb the import of Japanese textiles, which were damaging the British textile market in Australia. Japan reacted to the new tariffs with trade barriers of its own. After both sides realized that the trade war was unproductive, an agreement was reached in 1937 to relax restrictions.

In recognition of the importance of Japanese ties, Tokyo was the second capital (after Washington DC in the United States) where Australia established a legation separate from the British embassy.

During World War II, Australian territory was directly threatened by Japanese invasion, and Japanese forces attacked Darwin, Broome, and Sydney Harbour. In 1941, the ethnic Japanese population in Australia was interned, and most were deported to Japan at the end of the war. Australian forces played an active combat role in battles throughout the Southeast Asia and South West Pacific theater of World War II, most notable events of the war among both parties were the Kokoda Track campaign and the Sandakan Death Marches (of which in 2014, the then Japanese Prime Minister Shinzo Abe offered his sincere condolences on behalf of the Japanese people to the Australian Parliament). Australian forces also played a significant role in the post-war Occupation of Japan.

During the Occupation period 

The first time a large number of Australians were in Japan was during the postwar Occupation of Japan. Australians were part of the British Commonwealth Occupation Force. Around 16,000 Australians served in the force. For the entire length of its history the BCOF had an Australian officer. The Australian contribution to the force was 4,700 infantry, 5,300 base personnel, 2,200 from the Royal Australian Air Force, and 130 from the Australian General Hospital. The Royal Australian Navy was also present as part of the British Pacific Fleet.
For two-thirds of the period of occupation the Commonwealth was represented solely by Australians.

Australia played a minor role in the Japan campaign in the last months of the war and was preparing to participate in the invasion of Japan at the time the war ended. Several Australian warships operated with the British Pacific Fleet (BPF) during the Battle of Okinawa and Australian destroyers later escorted British aircraft carriers and battleships during attacks on targets in the Japanese home islands. Despite its distance from Japan, Australia was the BPF's main base and a large number of facilities were built to support the fleet.

Australia's participation in the planned invasion of Japan would have involved elements of all three services fighting as part of Commonwealth forces. It was planned to form a new 10th Division from existing AIF personnel which would form part of the Commonwealth Corps with British, Canadian and New Zealand units. The corps' organisation was to be identical to that of a US Army corps, and it would have participated in the invasion of the Japanese home island of Honshū which was scheduled for March 1946. Australian ships would have operated with the BPF and US Pacific Fleet and two RAAF heavy bomber squadrons and a transport squadron were scheduled to be redeployed from Britain to Okinawa to join the strategic bombardment of Japan as part of Tiger Force.

General Blamey signed the Japanese Instrument of Surrender on behalf of Australia during the ceremony held on board  on 2 September 1945. Several RAN warships were among the Allied ships anchored in Tokyo Bay during the proceedings. Following the main ceremony on board Missouri, Japanese field commanders surrendered to Allied forces across the Pacific Theatre. Australian forces accepted the surrender of their Japanese opponents at ceremonies conducted at Morotai, several locations in Borneo, Timor, Wewak, Rabaul, Bougainville and Nauru.

Post-war diplomatic relations 
Diplomatic relations between Australia and Japan were re-established in 1952, following the termination of the Allied occupation, and Haruhiko Nishi was appointed as Japanese ambassador to Australia. In 1957, Australian Prime Minister Robert Menzies visited Japan with the aim of strengthening economic and political ties between the two countries.

Australia and Japan celebrated the thirtieth anniversary of the 1976 Basic Treaty of Friendship and Cooperation in 2006. In a joint statement issued in March 2006, Australian Foreign Minister Alexander Downer and Japanese Foreign Minister Taro Aso declared the "partnership" between Australia and Japan, based on "shared democratic values, mutual respect, deep friendship, and shared strategic views", to be "stronger than ever".

A number of Australian politicians have been awarded the Order of the Rising Sun, the first national decoration awarded by the Japanese government. Recipients include former Prime Ministers of Australia such as Edmund Barton, Robert Menzies, John McEwen, Malcolm Fraser, Bob Hawke and John Howard.

Australia and Japan have agreed to work together towards the reform of the United Nations, including the realisation of Japan's permanent membership of the Security Council, and to strengthen various regional forums, including the Asia-Pacific Economic Cooperation (APEC), the ASEAN Regional Forum (ARF) and the East Asia Summit (EAS).

In March 2007 Australia and Japan signed a joint security pact.
The scope of security cooperation includes:

 Law enforcement on combating transnational crime, including trafficking in illegal narcotics and precursors, people smuggling and trafficking, counterfeiting currency and arms smuggling
 Border security
 Counter-terrorism
 Disarmament and counter-proliferation of weapons of mass destruction and their means of delivery
 Peace operations
 Exchange of strategic assessments and related information
 Maritime and aviation security
 Humanitarian relief operations, including disaster relief
 Contingency planning, including for pandemics

During the deployment of the Japan Self-Defense Forces on a humanitarian and reconstruction mission to Iraq from 2004 to 2006, Australian units assisted Japanese Special Forces in the protection of Japanese bases.

Diplomatic relations have come under pressure over ideological differences regarding Japan's scientific whaling program. In May 2010, Australia started legal action to halt Japanese whale hunts, despite senior Australian officials and bureaucrats expressing the opinion that the legal action would likely fail. Japan's repeated requests that Australia cease its support for Sea Shepherd's violent attacks upon its whaling fleet have been refused. Although in 2013, Foreign Minister Julie Bishop stated while on a diplomatic trip to Japan that the Australian Government does not officially support Sea Shepherd and disapproves of Sea Shepherd and their violent activities in halting whaling.

This turned around in 2013 with the new Abbott Government calling Japan Australia's "closest friend" in Asia, when Japanese Prime Minister Shinzo Abe visited Australia to conclude the Japan–Australia Economic Partnership Agreement and to address the future of the relationship between Australia and Japan, being the first Japanese Prime Minister to address the Parliament of Australia.

With the new Turnbull Government starting in 2015, Prime Minister Malcolm Turnbull has made a few changes to the bilateral relationship between Australia and Japan. This included a slight pullback in terms of the recent bid for the upgrade of the Royal Australian Navy submarine fleet in 2016, which the new government eventually decided on the French bid, therefore resulting in slight outcry from the Japanese Government; its worth noting that the previous Australian Prime Minister Tony Abbott had closely hinted for his government to choose the Japanese bid over both the French and German bids.

However, Prime Minister Malcolm Turnbull has decided to stimulate values from the previous Abbott Government to his government by incorporating themes such as the "closest friend" in Asia. This was seen with increasing bilateral ties in terms of military co-operation, trade, and cultural friendship. In late 2016, Turnbull stopped by on a lighting trip to Tokyo and started to develop a close relationship with Prime Minister Shinzo Abe, following his predecessor's example. Abe later visited Turnbull in Sydney early 2017 during a pivot to South-East Asia, where both increased military, trade, cultural, and sporting ties. Both also discussed the South China Sea Crisis, North Korea, and their anxiety to co-operate with their mutual ally, the United States' new Trump Administration.

In December 2021, Australia and Japan, along with the United States, pledged a new undersea internet cable for Nauru, Kiribati and the Federated States of Micronesia.

At a virtual summit on 6 January 2022, Japanese Prime Minister Fumio Kishida and Australian Prime Minister Scott Morrison formally signed the Reciprocal Access Agreement (RAA) - to allow their respective militaries to work seamlessly with each other on defence and humanitarian operations.

Economic relations, tourism and migration

Trade 

Australian trade had shifted away from other Commonwealth countries toward Asia around the 1960s and 1970s. Japan in particular had emerged as the leading trading partner. In 1966–67, Japan surpassed the United Kingdom "to become the largest market for Australian exports". Japan is now the second largest export market for Australia (after China), although Japan is ranked only third as a source of imports to Australia after the United States and China. Because of this, Australia has had a trade surplus with Japan.

Australia is a predominant source of food and raw materials for Japan. In 1990 Australia accounted for 5.4 percent of total Japanese imports, a share that held relatively steady in the late 1980s. Australia was the largest single supplier of coal, iron ore, wool, and sugar to Japan in 1990. Australia is also a supplier of uranium. By 1987 Japanese investment made Australia the single largest source of Japanese regional imports. The ban on American and Canadian beef recently made Australia the largest supplier of beef in Japan.

Resource development projects in Australia attracted Japanese capital, as did trade protectionism by necessitating local production for the Australian market. Investments in Australia totaled US$8.1 billion in 1988, accounting for 4.4 percent of Japanese direct investment abroad. But, because of the broadening reach of Japan's foreign investment, this share had been declining, down from 5.9 percent in 1980. During the 1980s, Japanese real estate investment increased in Australia, particularly in the ocean resort area known as the Gold Coast, where Japanese presence was strong enough to create some resentment.

As Japan protects its agriculture, Australia faces quotas, high tariffs, and standards barriers in exporting agricultural products including beef, butter, and apples to Japan. Japan is "Australia's largest beef export market, taking 35.8% of all beef shipped in 2011".

Negotiations commenced in 2007 on a bilateral free trade agreement between Australia and Japan.

As Australia trades raw minerals to Japan for large amounts of earnings, while Japan trades technology such as televisions, computers and cars. Japan is one of the leading suppliers of a number of manufactured goods imported to Australia: Japan has been the principal source of cars and motorcycles being imported to Australia.

Migration 
According to Australian Bureau of Statistics data from 2006, 40,968 Australian people claimed Japanese ancestry. According to Japan's Ministry of Foreign Affairs, there were approximately 9,900, Australian citizens resident in Japan as of 30 June 2017.

Tourism 
Japan allows visa-free access to Australians, and Australia has reciprocated: Australia allows Japanese to apply for Electronic Travel Authority (ETA) immediate authorisation - visa-free access for up to 3 months. In 2018, Japan was the fifth largest source of tourism for Australia, with 484,000 Japanese citizens visiting Australia that year. It placed behind the United Kingdom, the United States, New Zealand and China. According to data from Google, Japan was Australia's top-searched destination between 2002 and 2022, ranking ahead of New Zealand.

Educational partnerships 
In 1980, Australia and Japan agreed on a working holiday scheme for young people from both countries. The working holiday program was the first one for Japan.

Opinion polls 

According to a 2017 BBC World Service Poll, 78% of Australians view Japan's influence positively, with 17% expressing a negative view, making Australia one of the most pro-Japanese countries in the world.

According to a 2021 poll by the Lowy Institute, Japan is the third most positively viewed country by Australians, with a 73% positivity rating. It ranked behind the United Kingdom and New Zealand. In the 2020 version of the poll, it again ranked at third with a 69% rating, behind the United Kingdom and Canada (New Zealand was not included in the 2020 poll, nor was Canada in the 2021 poll). In the 2022 version of the poll, Japan placed fourth with a 74% rating, behind the United Kingdom which was third with a 77% rating, and Canada and New Zealand, which were the two most favorably viewed countries with ratings of 80% and 86%.

In a 2018 survey by the Japanese government, 65% of respondents had a favorable view of Australia. It was the second most favorably viewed region in the survey, behind the United States, and garnered a higher rating than South Korea, Latin America, Africa, China and Russia, which was the least favorably viewed. 71% of respondents also felt that Japan had a good relationship with Australia, while 74% felt that the future development of relations was important for the two countries and the Asia-Pacific.

See also 

 Foreign relations of Australia
 Foreign relations of Japan
 Japanese Australian
 Quadrilateral Security Dialogue
 Reciprocal Access Agreement

Literature 
 
 
 
 
 
 David Walton, "Australia, Japan and the Region" in Mari Pangestu and Ligang Song (Eds.), Japan's future in East Asia and the Pacific (Canberra : Asia Pacific Press, 2007) pp. 31–53.
 Joint Ministerial Statement, Australia-Japan, 'Building a Comprehensive Strategic Relationship', Sydney, 18 March 2006, foreignminister.gov.au
 Japan-Australia Joint Declaration on Security Cooperation, Tokyo, 13 March 2007,
 安全保障協力に関する日豪共同宣言(仮訳), Tokyo, 13 March 2007, mofa.go.jp
 Strengthening Australia-Japan Economic Relations: A report prepared by Professor Gordon de Brouwer (Australian National University) and Dr. Tony Warren (Network Economics Consulting Group) for the Department of Foreign Affairs and Trade, April 2001

References

External links 
 Homepage of the Australian Embassy in Japan
 Embassy of Japan in Australia
 Japan-Australia Relations Ministry of Foreign Affairs of Japan
 Japan - Australian Government - Department of Foreign Affairs and Trade

 
Bilateral relations of Japan 
Japan